The Bolognese School of painting, also known as the School of Bologna, flourished  between the 16th and 17th centuries in Bologna, which rivalled Florence and Rome as the center of painting in Italy. Its most important representatives include the Carracci family, including Ludovico Carracci and his two cousins, the brothers Agostino and Annibale Carracci. Later, it included other Baroque painters: Domenichino and Lanfranco, active mostly in Rome, eventually Guercino and Guido Reni, and Accademia degli Incamminati in Bologna, which was run by Lodovico Carracci. Certain artistic conventions, which over time became traditionalist, had been developed in Rome during the first decades of the 16th century. As time passed, some artists sought new approaches to their work that no longer reflected only the Roman manner. The Carracci studio sought innovation or invention, seeking new ways to break away from traditional modes of painting while continuing to look for inspiration from their literary contemporaries; the studio formulated a style that was distinguished from the recognized manners of art in their time. This style was seen as both systematic and imitative, borrowing particular motifs from the past Roman schools of art and innovating a modernistic approach.

List of artists

Period of activity: 1501–1600
 Francesco Francia (1447-1517)
 Amico Aspertini (1474–1552)
 Girolamo da Treviso (1497–1544)
 Pier Maria Pennacchi (1464- before 1516)
 Girolamo da Carpi  (1501–1556)
 Lorenzo Sabbatini (c. 1530 – 1576)
 Denys Calvaert  (1540–1619)
 Pietro Faccini (1552–1614)
 Prospero Fontana (1512–1597)
 Lavinia Fontana (1552–1614)
 Giovanni Francesco Bezzi (Nosadella) (1530–1571)
 Bartolomeo Passerotti (1529–1592)
 Bartolomeo Cesi (1556–1629)
 Annibale Carracci (1560–1609)
 Ludovico Carracci (1555–1619)
 Agostino Carracci (1557–1602)
 Carlo Bononi (1569 – c. 1632)
 Sisto Badalocchio (1581 – c. 1647)
 Camillo Procaccini (1551–1629)

1601–1650
 Angelo Michele Toni
 Benedetto Gennari 
 Guido Reni (1575–1642)
 Domenichino (1581–1641)
 Francesco Albani (1578–1660)
  Giovanni Francesco Barbieri (Guercino) (1591–1666)
 Lionello Spada
 Lucio Massari
 Francesco Brizio
 Giacomo Cavedone
 Bartolomeo Schedoni
 Francesco Gessi (1558–1649)
 Simone Cantarini (Il Pesarese) (1612–1648)
 Carlo Cignani (1628–1719)
 Giovanni Antonio Burrini
 Giovanni Gioseffo dal Sole
 Lorenzo Pasinelli (1629–1772)
 Elisabetta Sirani (1638–1665)
 Marcantonio Franceschini 
 Guido Cagnacci (1601–1663)
 Giuseppe Maria Mazza (sculptor, 1653-1741)
 Lorenzo Garbieri (1580–1654)
 Domenico Maria Canuti (1620–1660) 
 Angelo Michele Colonna (1604–1687)
 Agostino Mitelli (1609–1660).
 Enrico Haffner (1640–1702)
 Giovanni Maria Bibiena
 Giovan Giacomo Monti
 Giovanni Battista Viola
 Alessandro Tiarini
 Giovanni Andrea Donducci (il Mastelletta)

1650–1700 and after

 Giuseppe Maria Crespi (1665-1747)
 Donato Creti (1671-1749)
 Ubaldo Gandolfi (1728-1781)
 Gaetano Gandolfi (1734-1802)
 Giuseppe Marchesi (il Sansone) (1778-1867)

1850-1960 (approximately) The landscape painters 
 Luigi Bertelli (1833-1916)
Alessandro Scorzoni (1858-1933)
Flavio Bertelli (1865-1941)
 Giovanni Secchi (1876-1950)
 Guglielmo Pizzirani (1886-1971)
Antonino Sartini (1889-1954)

See also 
Florentine School
Lucchese School
School of Ferrara
Sienese School

References

Further reading
 Raimond Van Marle. The Development of the Italian Schools of Painting, Volume 4  (1924) pp 394-481.

Baroque painting
Italian art movements